In American folklore, the Gumberoo is a fearsome critter with hide so tough that bullets bounce off of it.

Description 
The gumberoo was described by early lumberjacks to be larger than a bear with a tough, shiny, black hide that nothing could pierce. The only way to kill it was said to be fire, which caused the creatures to explode.

References

Fearsome critters